Udaya Music is a Kannada pay television music channel, and is part of the Chennai-based Sun Network of Tamil Nadu. It was initially launched as U2 (Udaya 2) and later renamed as Udaya Music.

History

Logos

See also
List of Kannada-language television channels
Television in India
Media in Karnataka
Media of India

References

Kannada-language television channels
Television stations in Bangalore
Television channels and stations established in 2006
2006 establishments in Karnataka

Music television channels in India